Der Nord-Westen was a German language weekly newspaper published in Manitowoc, Wisconsin. It began publication on September 5, 1855 under Carl Schmidt, suspended publication in November 1860, resuming publication in February 1865, and continued publication through 1909.

Manitowoc writer Harold E. Bergman has created a series of extracts from Den Nord-Westen of items of genealogical interest translated into English which are available on the website of the Manitowoc Public Library.

References 

1855 establishments in Wisconsin
1909 disestablishments in Wisconsin
Defunct newspapers published in Wisconsin
Defunct weekly newspapers
German-language newspapers published in Wisconsin
Manitowoc County, Wisconsin
Publications disestablished in 1909
Newspapers established in 1855
Weekly newspapers published in the United States